Tiger Stadium may refer to:

 Tiger Stadium (Corsicana), high school stadium in Corsicana, Texas
 Tiger Stadium (Detroit), former home of the Detroit Tigers baseball team
 Tiger Stadium (LSU), home of the Louisiana State University American football team
 Tiger Stadium (West Alabama), home of the University of West Alabama American football team
 Paul Brown Tiger Stadium, Massillon, Ohio

See also 
 Comerica Park, Detroit, the present home of Detroit Tigers baseball team